The Treene is a river, hydrologically  and nominally  long, in the north of Schleswig-Holstein, Germany. It is a right-bank tributary of the River Eider. It starts in northern Angeln, southeast of Flensburg, and flows mainly south-south-west before joining the Eider near Friedrichstadt.

The upper course is called Bondenau. Its source is situated in the ground of Mohrkirch. The name 'Treene' begins at the Tresssee lake near Großsolt in the district of Schleswig-Flensburg. After about  it reaches the town of Friedrichstadt (in Nordfriesland district). It is the most important tributary of Eider river. Since the construction of Kiel Canal, it is even stronger than Eider river itself.

Details
So the Treene is an unusual case of a river that rises on a peninsula in the Baltic Sea, but flows into the North Sea. Half a kilometer before the Treßsee (Lake Tress), it is joined by a stream named Kielstau or Kielsau, by some people considered another headstream of Treene river. Between the Treßsee and Tüdal, there is a natural reserve covering an area of  called Obere Treenelandschaft that extends along the river. Especially the lower part is a retreat area for migratory birds ("stork village" Bergenhusen).

The middling section between Langstedt and Treia developed to be a popular canoe district, the lower section can be used by pleasure crafts as well. In Schwabstedt, there is a public swimming site in the river.

History
From antiquity to High Middle Ages, the strip of dry land between Treene wetlands and Schlei had the function of an isthmus. Here the Danevirke secured the south border of Denmark, which at that time was marked by the Eider, more than  further south. And the route Eider - Treene - Rheider Au (tributary of the Treene) - Schlei served as a shipping route between the North Sea and Baltic Sea (see also Hedeby). Whether thereby boats were pulled between Selker Noor (an extension of Schlei inlet) and the Rheider Au  on primitive rollers over the 20 m high land ridges (usual opinion), or whether the Kograben, 1 to 2 km south of and parallel to the walls of Danevirke, also served as a shipping canal, has not yet finally been clarified.

See also
 Eider-Treene Depression
 Treene (municipality)
 List of rivers of Schleswig-Holstein

Sources
Gerd Quedenbaum: Vorflut. Der Eiderverband, ein Beitrag zur Geschichte des Deich- und Entwässerungswesens in der mittleren Eiderregion. Eider-Verlag, Düsseldorf 2000
Gerd Quedenbaum: Sorge und Treene. Eider-Verlag, Düsseldorf 1984

References

Rivers of Schleswig-Holstein
Rivers of Germany